Zahra Universe is an American pop singer, pianist, composer/songwriter, producer, actress, and humanitarian.  Notable single releases include “Drop” (2008), “Lock Me Up” (2009), “Falling in Love” (2011), 
“Gimme a Sign” (2012), “Dancin by the Fire” feat. Soprano (2012), and “Sela Sela (Dance Together)” with Wes Madiko  and produced by Will.i.Am Productions, which was named Official Song of the Africa Football Cup of Nations, South Africa 2013 (2013 Africa Cup of Nations), all released by Arusa Entertainment.  She is a pioneering artist in 3D technology, having released two 3D music videos “Falling in Love” and “Dancin by the Fire”.  Being classically trained in piano and voice, Zahra Universe has performed in English, French, Spanish, Italian, German, and Portuguese.  She has done concert tours in America, Africa, Europe, and Asia.  Most recently she has been featured in major European media such as BBC Africa Today, France 24, VoxAfrica, and Radio France International’s Couleurs Tropicales.

In addition to musical theatre, Zahra Universe has made several TV acting appearances including programs on the History Channel and Investigation Discovery, as well as landing the lead role in a commercial for MeMe2 Magazine.  She has founded the non-profit organization Cultural Universe Exchange which is geared toward encouraging cultural dialogue and helping schools and youth in need of supplies, especially those toward improving education.  In 2011, Zahra Universe was honored with the title of “Ambassador of Goodwill” for the growing seaport city of Kribi, Cameroon.  She speaks English, French, Spanish, and Mandarin Chinese.  Her upcoming single “Dirty Thoughts” and album is scheduled for release early 2013.

References

 Zahra Universe Featured on BBC’s Africa Today Podcast, January 15, 2013
 Zahra Universe Featured on France 24, Culture Segment, January  8, 2013
 Zahra Universe Featured VoxAfrica’s Sports 360 January 14, 2013
 Zahra Universe Featured Radio France International Couleurs Tropicales January 10th 2013
 Zahra Universe Debuts Dancin by the Fire 3D Music Video
  Investigation Discovery, Deadly Affairs "In Too Deep" Season 1, Episode 1 September 8, 2012
 Zahra Universe Release of Falling In Love Video December 17, 2011
 Cameroon Online
 American Pop Artist Zahra Universe Teams Up with International Star Wes Madiko to Break Down Borders!
 Zahra Universe Inspired by Classic French Cinema in Recently Released Music Video 'Falling in Love'
 Universe Becomes African Royalty On-Location of Latest Music Video Sela-Sela
 
 Sela Sela, the official song of the Africa Cup of Nations
 Zahra Universe Song “Sela Sela (Dance Together)” Selected as Anthem for Africa Football Cup of Nations, South Africa 2013
 Zahra Universe Featured in Music Now Magazine, Vol. 1 Issue 6

External links
 Zahra Universe Official Website
 Cultural Universe Exchange
 Zahra on Facebook
 Zahra on Myspace
 Zahra on Twitter
 Zahra on YouTube
 Sela Sela Project Website

Living people
American women pop singers
Year of birth missing (living people)
21st-century American women